Lloyd Stone (June 29, 1912 – March 9, 1993) was an American poet best known for the poem "This Is My Song". Stone was also an illustrator and composer.

Life
Lloyd Shelbourne Stone was born on June 29, 1912, in Coalinga, California. His parents, Lowends Columbus Stone and Gurtha Emalaine Marr were born in Missouri and married there in 1910 before moving to California. In California, Lowends Stone got a job as a "well puller" working for the Associated Oil Company of Coalinga, on the Shawmut lease. His mother worked as a seamstress.

Stone attended Lindsay High School, Lindsay, California, graduating in 1930.  He was president of his class in his junior year. He then attended the University of Southern California (USC), majoring in music. He wrote the poem "This Is My Song" before (or at about the time of) his graduation.

He planned to be a teacher, but instead, in 1936 at age 24, he joined up with a circus on its way to Hawaii.

He did not stay with the circus for long, but did stay in Hawaii. After a short stint as a designer in a jewelry shop, he joined the staff at Kulamanu Studios as pianist-composer. While at Kulamanu Studios he composed a large part of their modern dance music.

His poetry was praised in a Hawaiian journal, The Islander: "Mr. Stone is probably among the most versatile contributors to the arts of whom Hawaii can boast. His poetry reflects Hawaii. He does not sing of the palms and the surf, but of the earthy human beauty which is the heritage of the islands. He finds his niche as an interpreter of that which lies beneath the lovely outward shell of Hawaii. He has made Hawaii his home. And Hawaii is fortunate."

The Legislature of the Territory of Hawaii passed a concurrent resolution in 1951 "bestowing the honor and title of poet laureate of Hawaii (Ka Haku-Mele O Hawaii)" on Lloyd Stone.

He wrote many books of poetry while in Hawaii, illustrated his own works and those by others, taught in the public schools of Hawaii, and also created and sold greeting cards.

After spending many years in Hawaii, he alternated residency between California and Hawaii. He served as state president of the California Federation of Chaparral Poets in 1982.

His father died in Lindsay in 1978.  His mother lived to be 100, dying in 1987.

Stone died, age 80, in Visalia, California, on March 9, 1993.

His two-line obituary in the Fresno Bee described him as "a retired teacher", and made no mention of his poems, his being the poet laureate of Hawaii, or his well-known "Song of Peace".

"This Is My Song"

Stone wrote "This Is My Song" around the time of his graduation from the University of Southern California. In 1934, Ira B. Wilson of the Lorenz Publishing Company set Stone's words to the hymn-like portion of Finlandia by Jean Sibelius. This arrangement was published under the title "A Song of Peace".

Because they are both set to the same music from Finlandia, "This Is My Song" / "A Song of Peace" is sometimes inaccurately called the "Finlandia Hymn". The Finlandia Hymn is more appropriately applied to the work that appeared seven years after A Song of Peace was published — when the words of the Finnish poet Veikko Koskenniemi were set to Sibelius's music.

Although his poem has appeared as a hymn in 26 hymnals, there is nothing that suggests Stone was particularly religious himself. By the late 1930s, "A Song of Peace" had become a favorite of the Wesleyan Service Guild of the Methodist Church. The executive secretary of the Guild, Marion Norris, asked Georgia Elma Harkness to give Lloyd Stone's poem a more Christian character. Harkness recalls writing her stanza sometime during the period 1937-39 while she was teaching at Mount Holyoke. It became the official hymn of the Wesleyan Service Guild. Not all hymnals include this third verse meant to "Christianize" the hymn.

Poetry and other works 

Lloyd Stone's poem "Seven Days" was published in Esquire magazine. (In the January 1938 issue, "Seven Days" appeared opposite F. Scott Fitzgerald's "Financing Finnegan.")

His published works include: For You (with decorations by the author) (1937)—[original title For Me], The Story of an Ozark Grandmother: As the Grandmother, Jane Honey Howell Marr, Told her Story to her Grandson, Lloyd Stone. Point Lookout, Missouri self-illustrated (1938), Poems to Be Served with a Poi Cocktail (1940), Lei of Hours (1941), Hawaiian War Chant (October 1942), Aloha Means an Island (1944), In This Hawaiian Net (1945), Hawaiian Christmas (1945), Keaka, the Hawaiian Fishboy by Max Keith, illustrated by Lloyd Stone, Laughter Wears a Coconut Hat (1948), Escape to the Sun with illustrations by the author (1949), The Cave of Makalei: Old Hawaii Pageant Aloha Week (1958), Song Stories of Hawaii by Carol Roes with drawings by Lloyd Stone (1959), A Children’s Hawaiian Program: Eight Islands by Carol Roes, with drawings by Lloyd Stone (1963), Boy's Illustrated Book of Old Hawaiian Sports (na pa'ani kahiko) (1964), Christmas Luau (1976), and San Joaquin Carols (1977).

References

1912 births
1993 deaths
20th-century American poets
Poets Laureate of Hawaii